The Wyoming Cowboys soccer team was a former NCAA Division I men's college soccer team that represented the University of Wyoming.

References

 
Defunct soccer clubs in Wyoming